The 1962 Oklahoma Sooners football team represented the University of Oklahoma in the Big Eight Conference during the 1962 NCAA University Division football season. In their sixteenth season under head coach Bud Wilkinson, the Sooners were 8–2 in the regular season (7–0 in conference) and played their home games on campus at Oklahoma Memorial Stadium in Norman, Oklahoma.

In the Orange Bowl on New Year's Day, the Sooners were shut out 17–0 by fifth-ranked Alabama and finished at 8–3.

Schedule

Roster
HB Joe Don Looney, Jr.

Rankings

Postseason

NFL draft
Three Sooners were selected in the 1963 NFL Draft.

Staff
After the season in early January, 31-year-old assistant coach Eddie Crowder, a former Sooner quarterback, was hired as head coach at the University of Colorado, also a member of the Big Eight.

References

Oklahoma
Oklahoma Sooners football seasons
Big Eight Conference football champion seasons
Oklahoma Sooners football